RCN Radio (Radio Cadena Nacional, "National Radio Network") is one of the main radio networks in Colombia. Founded in 1949 with the integration of Radio Pacífico (Cali), La Voz de Medellín' and Emisora Nueva Granada (Bogotá).

Carlos Ardila Lülle is its main shareholder since 1973.

 Networks and radioformulas 
RCN La Radio (formerly Cadena Básica RCN): the main network, broadcasting news, variety, and sports.
La FM: mix of news and music in FM. Founded in 1996.
Antena 2: sports. Founded in the early 1980s
La Mega: youth programming, Top 40. Founded in the early 1990s
Amor Estéreo (formerly La cadena del amor''): balada in Spanish
Radio Uno: at first, an AM station specialized in vallenato. In 2005, it moved to FM with a mix of tropical music, with rancheras, and baladas in Spanish.
Rumba Estéreo: tropical music (salsa, merengue, vallenato), in the 2000s switched to reggaeton.
Bolero Estéreo: specialized in boleros, online-only since the 2000s.

RCN La Radio frequencies 

It also operates affiliate stations in Tame (Tame FM Stereo), Ocana, Mariquita (Ondas del Gualí), Puerto Lopez (Marandúa Stereo).

You can listen to RCN Radio in New York in 98.7 and 89.9 FM in RCN Radio International.

RCN Radio broadcasts in New York City at 98.7 FM and RCN Radio Internacional broadcasts at 89.9 FM.

Partner radio stations 
 Radio Mitre Argentina
 Radio Programas del Perú Peru
 Radio Panamericana Bolivia
 Univisión Radio United States
 Cadena Radial Ecuatoriana Ecuador
 Radio Cope Spain
 Radio Caracas Radio Venezuela

International partner agencies 
 Associated Press
 EFE

References

External links 
Official site

Radio stations established in 1949
1949 establishments in Colombia
Radio stations in Colombia